On January 28, 1992, Azerbaijani transport helicopter Mil Mi-8 was shot down near the town of Shusha by a heat-seeking missile fired by Armenian separatist forces.

The 1993 report by U.S. Federal Aviation Administration on aviation security called it the "most significant incident" involving civil aviation in Central Eurasia.

Background
Serious air warfare during the Nagorno-Karabakh War broke out in January 1992. Azeri aircraft became easy targets for Armenian armed forces. On January 9, the Armenians first claimed to have shot down an Azeri helicopter. More claims followed on January 24, 28 and 31 – all of them over Nagorno-Karabakh, the last being a Mi-8 downed from MANPADs over the village of Huha. On January 31, the Azeris claimed the downings of two Mi-8s that supported the first Armenian offensive.

Shootdown
The Mi-8 helicopter transported 44 persons aboard (41 passengers, all civilians, and 3 crew) when it departed the town of Aghdam for Shusha, which was blockaded by Armenians. The craft was downed en route by a surface-to-air missile. All aboard were killed. According to Azeri journalist Kerim Kerimli, who assisted in collecting bodies at the site and confirmed the number of fatalities, the missile was launched from Stepanakert.

Armenian officials stated that the helicopter was carrying weapons and ammunition to Azeris attacking Armenian villages.

See also

List of aircraft shootdowns during the Nagorno-Karabakh Conflict

References

Accidents and incidents involving the Mil Mi-8
1992 in Azerbaijan
First Nagorno-Karabakh War
Aviation accidents and incidents in Azerbaijan
20th-century aircraft shootdown incidents
Aviation accidents and incidents in 1992
January 1992 events in Asia